Roselyne et les lions (Roselyne and the Lions) is a 1989 French film directed by Jean-Jacques Beineix.

Thierry does odd jobs in a zoo in Marseille in exchange for lessons from Frazier the lion trainer. He meets Roselyne and they leave together to find work. They are taken on by a circus in Munich and achieve success as lion trainers when the trainer Klint loses his nerve.

Cast
 Isabelle Pasco - Roselyne
 Gérard Sandoz - Thierry
 Gabriel Monnet - Frazier
 Philippe Clévenot - Bracquard
 Günter Meisner - Klint
 Wolf Harnisch - Koenig
 Jacques Le Carpentier - Markovitch
 Carlos Pavlidis - Petit Prince
 Jacques Mathou - Armani
 Dumitru Furdui - Stainer
 Jaroslav Vízner - Gunter
 Patrice Abbou - Ben Jemoul 2
 Silvio Bolino - Touron
 François Boum - Ben Jemoul 1
 Guillaume Briat - Matou

External links 
 

1989 films
Circus films
French romantic comedy-drama films
1980s French-language films
Films directed by Jean-Jacques Beineix
Films set in Marseille
1980s French films